Vincent S. Shekleton (November 16, 1896 – April 23, 1958) was an American football center for the Racine Legion of the National Football League (NFL) in 1922. He played at the collegiate level at Colgate and Marquette.

Biography
Shekleton was born on November 16, 1896 in Lawler, Iowa and died on April 23, 1958 in Milwaukee, Wisconsin.

References

People from Chickasaw County, Iowa
Players of American football from Iowa
American football centers
Colgate University alumni
Marquette University alumni
Colgate Raiders football players
Marquette Golden Avalanche football players
Racine Legion players
1896 births
1958 deaths